The East Texas Saberkats were a team of the Women's Football Alliance.  Based in Marshall, the Saberkats were originally going to play in the National Women's Football Association before moving to the WFA. On March 14, 2009, it was announced that the team had folded.

Season-By-Season

|-
|2009 || 0 || 6 || 0 || 4th American Southwest || --

2009 Season Schedule

References

External links
 East Texas Saberkats official website

Women's Football Alliance teams
Marshall, Texas
American football teams in Texas
American football teams established in 2008
American football teams disestablished in 2009
2008 establishments in Texas
2009 disestablishments in Texas
Women's sports in Texas